Ancuţa Violeta "Anca" Stoenescu (born 1 January 1980) is a Romanian basketball player. She competed in the 2020 Summer Olympics.

References

External links
 
 
 
 
 
 

1980 births
Living people
Sportspeople from Timișoara
Romanian women's basketball players
3x3 basketball players at the 2020 Summer Olympics
Olympic 3x3 basketball players of Romania
Romanian women's 3x3 basketball players